The Berkeley Fire Department (BFD) provides fire protection and emergency medical services to the city of Berkeley, California, United States as well as the University of California, Berkeley.

History
In 1877, volunteer fire companies were first organized. On the 22nd of October 1904 the Berkeley City Hall was destroyed by a fire and shortly thereafter a paid department was formed.  In 1914, the Berkeley Fire Department became the first department west of the Mississippi to be fully motorized.  In 1923, over 600 homes and businesses were destroyed by the 1923 Berkeley, California fire.  In 1977, the fire department placed ambulances into service and took over the responsibility of emergency medical transport from the police department.  In 1986, the department began providing paramedic level emergency medical services to the city.  In 1991, 63 homes in Berkeley burned down during the Oakland firestorm of 1991.

Stations & Equipment
The Berkeley Fire Department operates out of 7 Fire Stations, located throughout the city.  Beginning in July 2017 the Berkeley Fire Department has added staffing for a 4th ambulance.

See also

Berkeley
Oakland Fire Department
Alameda County Fire Department

References

Government of Berkeley, California
Fire departments in California